Shelley College (formerly known as Shelley High School) is a coeducational upper school and sixth form on the border between the villages of Shelley and Skelmanthorpe, West Yorkshire in England. The school gained Academy status in September 2011, as Shelley College - A Specialist Centre for Science. However, as of November 2014, it is no longer a specialist in science.

Unlike most high schools, pupils join Shelley College at Year 9, aged 13, because there is a middle school system in the surrounding area. The school has two main feeder schools, Kirkburton Middle School, which received a Grade 2 'Good' Ofsted report in April 2015, and Scissett Middle School, which also received a Grade 2 Ofsted report in November 2013.

The school has departments for science and design technology. The sixth form has its own separate block, the Altitude Building, which holds a small café, study room (ICT suite), office and toilets.

In February 2013, the school opened a new dining area and pastoral offices, followed by a new assembly hall and library in May 2013.

The 2013 Ofsted inspection report awarded the school 'Outstanding', an overall grade 1.

As of June 2018, Shelley College belonged to the expanding SHARE Multi-Academy Trust.

Notable alumni
 Ed Clancy, member of the gold medal winning men's team pursuit cycling team at the 2008 Beijing Olympics and the 2012 London Olympics; bronze medal winner in the men's omnium event at the 2012 London Olympics
 Lena Headey, actress who played Cersei Lannister in the HBO series Game of Thrones
 Daniel Kitson, Perrier award winning comedian 
 Kate Rusby, folk singer and songwriter
 Jodie Whittaker, actress who appeared in St. Trinians, Venus and Broadchurch. Plays the 13th Doctor in the BBC series Doctor Who
Aaliyah Powell, GB taekwondo athlete. Won a bronze medal in bantamweight at the 2019 World Taekwondo Championships.
Simon Charlton, Ex Premier League footballer who most notably played for Huddersfield Town, Southampton and Birmingham City.

References

External links
 

Upper schools in Kirklees
Academies in Kirklees
Kirkburton
Skelmanthorpe